The Groomsmen is a 2006 comedy film written and directed by Edward Burns.  It opened in New York City and Los Angeles on July 14, 2006.  Filming took place at many locations on City Island, New York.

Plot
A groom and his four groomsmen wrestle with issues such as fatherhood, homosexuality, honesty and growing up in the week leading up to his wedding.

Paulie, a self-supporting writer, is making plans for his marriage to Sue, his girlfriend who is in her 5th month of pregnancy. Paulie is strongly advised by his older brother Jimbo to not go through with the wedding. Jimbo, who runs a struggling business, is envious of Paulie, partly because his own childless marriage is unraveling.

T.C., who left the neighborhood without explanation eight years earlier, returns for the wedding. Apparently, before leaving, T.C. had stolen a Tom Seaver baseball card from Paulie's cousin Mike. Mike still harbors such resentment over the loss that he immediately starts a fight with T.C. Later, T.C. hesitantly reveals that he abruptly left the neighborhood because he's gay and that he stole Mike's card because, even though they were best friends, he hated him for his constant verbal gay bashing.

The neighborhood bar is owned by Dez, who is married with two children and is the most content and functional member of the gang. He is continually trying to "get the band back together". He has even pushed his own sons into learning the guitar and is seen riding them to become better.

Cast
 Edward Burns as Paulie
 Jessica Capshaw as Jen
 Spencer Fox as Jack
 John Leguizamo as T.C.
 Matthew Lillard as Dez
 Donal Logue as Jimbo
 Jay Mohr as Mike (Cousin of Paulie & Jimbo)
 Brittany Murphy as Sue
 Heather Burns as Jules
 John F. O'Donohue as Pops (Uncle of Paulie & Jimbo and father of Mike)
 Joseph O'Keefe as Roman Catholic Priest
 Joe Pistone as Topcat
 Kevin Kash as Strip Club MC
 Amy Leonard as Crystal
 Arthur J. Nascarella as Mr. B
 Shari Albert as Tina
 John Mahoney as Father of Paulie and Jimbo (cut from film; seen in bonus footage)

Production
Burns' then-girlfriend, supermodel Christy Turlington, was also five months pregnant when they married in June 2003. Turlington inspired Burns to rework the manuscript for this movie, which he hadn't worked on in many months.

Release 

The film opened on July 14, 2006 in a limited release of 26 theaters in the US. It grossed less than one million dollars foreign and domestic.

Reception
On review aggregator website Rotten Tomatoes, The Groomsmen has an approval rating of 52% based on 33 reviews. The website’s critics consensus reads, "Director and star Burns returns to his home turf -- dialogue-driven examinations of the relationships between men and women -- with uneven results."

In his review for The New York Times, Stephen Holden wrote, "What gives Mr. Burns’s movies their spark is his gut-level empathy for these people, most of whom he understands deeply and relies on for inspiration", but noted that with this film, Burns "is unable (or perhaps afraid) to contrive a story to match his attunement to place and personality. You tolerate the false sentimentality and his characters’ one-dimensional troubles the way you tolerate the conventions of a sitcom."
 Holden also opined that Leguizamo’s character felt underwritten.

References

External links
 
 
 

2006 films
2006 independent films
2006 romantic comedy films
2000s buddy comedy-drama films
American romantic comedy films
American buddy comedy-drama films
Films about weddings
Films about brothers
Films directed by Edward Burns
2000s English-language films
2000s American films
2006 LGBT-related films